Ochrosia borbonica is a species of plant in the family Apocynaceae. It is native to Mauritius and Réunion, and naturalized in Guangdong Province in China.

The species is listed as endangered.

References

borbonica
Endangered plants
Flora of Mauritius
Flora of Réunion
Plants described in 1791
Taxa named by Johann Friedrich Gmelin
Taxonomy articles created by Polbot